Bengt-Gösta Johansson (born 24 September 1944) is a Swedish former ice sledge hockey player. He won medals for Sweden at the 1994 Winter Paralympics, 1998 Winter Paralympics and 2002 Winter Paralympics.

References

External links
 

1945 births
Living people
Swedish sledge hockey players
Paralympic sledge hockey players of Sweden
Paralympic bronze medalists for Sweden
Paralympic silver medalists for Sweden
Paralympic gold medalists for Sweden
Paralympic medalists in sledge hockey
Ice sledge hockey players at the 1994 Winter Paralympics
Ice sledge hockey players at the 1998 Winter Paralympics
Ice sledge hockey players at the 2002 Winter Paralympics
Medalists at the 1994 Winter Paralympics
Medalists at the 1998 Winter Paralympics
Medalists at the 2002 Winter Paralympics
20th-century Swedish people
21st-century Swedish people